Kitsada Somkane or Nguyễn Văn Đa (born September 28, 1990) is a member of the Thailand men's national volleyball team. He has Vietnamese citizenship.

Career
SomKane played with the club Phitsanulok for the 2014/15 season.

Clubs
  Krung Kao (2010–2011)
  Suandusit (2011–2012)
  Maejo U. Thai-Denmark (2012–2013)
  Kasetsart (2013–2014)
  Phitsanulok (2014–2015)
  Nakhon Ratchasima (2015–2016)
  Tràng An Ninh Bình (2017)
  Bekasi BVN (2018)
  Visakha (2018–2021)
  Payak Sensei (2022)

Awards

Individuals
 2010–11 Thailand League "Best Scorer"

Clubs
 2014 Thai-Denmark Super League -  Bronze Medal, with Kasetsart 
 2015–16 Thailand League -  Runner-up, with Nakhon Ratchasima
 2016 Thai-Denmark Super League -  Champion, with Nakhon Ratchasima
 2018–19 Thailand League -  Third, with Visakha

Royal decoration
 2015 –  Gold Medalist (Sixth Class) of The Most Admirable Order of the Direkgunabhorn

References

1990 births
Living people
Kitsada Somkane
Kitsada Somkane
Volleyball players at the 2010 Asian Games
Volleyball players at the 2014 Asian Games
Volleyball players at the 2018 Asian Games
Kitsada Somkane
Kitsada Somkane
Kitsada Somkane
Southeast Asian Games medalists in volleyball
Competitors at the 2007 Southeast Asian Games
Competitors at the 2009 Southeast Asian Games
Competitors at the 2011 Southeast Asian Games
Competitors at the 2013 Southeast Asian Games
Competitors at the 2015 Southeast Asian Games
Competitors at the 2017 Southeast Asian Games
Kitsada Somkane
Competitors at the 2019 Southeast Asian Games
Wing spikers
Kitsada Somkane